St. James School was a grade school in Lakewood, Ohio founded in 1912.  The school closed in 2005 to merge its students into the Lakewood Catholic Academy.  The church associated with St. James School closed in the summer of 2010.

References 

Educational institutions established in 1912
Educational institutions disestablished in 2005
Lakewood, Ohio
Defunct schools in Ohio
1912 establishments in Ohio
2005 disestablishments in Ohio